Linda M. Deane is an English-born writer and editor living in Barbados.

Biography
The daughter of Barbadian parents, she received most of her secondary school education in England and earned a BA degree in Comparative American Studies from the University of Warwick. She has worked as a journalist in Barbados, the United Kingdom and the United States. She works as a tutor at the primary school level for creative writing. She was a founding member of Writers Ink Barbados.

Deane was co-editor with Robert Edison Sandiford of the 2007 anthology Shouts from the Outfield: The ArtsEtc Cricket Anthology, as well as other later collections. She is also a poet and essayist, and her work has appeared in various publications, including Poui, The Caribbean Writer and Bim: Arts for the 21st Century, and in the anthology The Understanding Between Foxes and Light. She also writes for children.

In 2006, she received first prize in the Frank Collymore Literary Endowment, also receiving the  Prime Minister's Award, for her collection of poetry Cutting Road Blues: A Narrative.

References 

Year of birth missing (living people)
Living people
Barbadian poets
Barbadian journalists
Black British women writers
Barbadian women writers
Barbadian women poets
Barbadian women journalists
21st-century poets
Alumni of the University of Warwick
21st-century Barbadian writers
21st-century Barbadian women writers